This article shows the rosters of all participating teams at the men's basketball tournament at the 2019 Pan American Games in Lima.

Argentina 
 

Source:

Dominican Republic 

Source:

Mexico 

Source:6 JUGADORES LNBP, MÉXICO ENCARARÁ LOS JUEGOS PANAMERICANOS LIMA 2019.

Puerto Rico 

Source:

United States 

Source:

Uruguay 
 

Source:

Venezuela 

Source:

Virgin Islands 
 

Source:

References

Roster, Men
Basketball squads at the Pan American Games